Aparajita Ghosh Das is an Indian actress who works in Bengali language films and television series. She made her debut in films with Anjan Das's film Iti Srikanta (2004). She appeared in Anjan Dutt's film Chalo Let's Go (2008).

Early life
She completed her post-graduation from Rabindra Bharati University.

Filmography
 Rajlokkhi o Shrikanto (2019)
 Posto (2017)
 Bhengchi (2015)
 Ek Phaali Rodh (2014)
 Bakita Byaktigoto (2013)
 Takhan Teish (2011)
 Haate Roilo Pistol (2011)
 Ektu Antorikotar Jonno (2010)
 Chowrasta- Crossroads of Love (2009)
 10:10 (2008)
 Chalo Let's Go (2008)
 Raat Barota Panch (2005)
 Iti Srikanta (2004)

Television & Web  
 2005-07 Ekdin Pratidin as Mohor
 2007 Bijoyini as Bhromor
 2008-10 Ekhane Aakash Neel as Hiya Chatterjee  (née O'Brien) 
 2012 Checkmate as Detective Mrinalini Dostidar
 2015-16 Kojagori as Kojagori Mallick aka Phuljhuri
 2016–18 Kusum Dola as Roopkatha Majumdar  aka Doll
 2022 Ulot Puran as Pompi
 2022–Present Ekka dokka as Ankita Majumdar

References

External links 

Actresses in Bengali cinema
Living people
Bengali television actresses
Rabindra Bharati University alumni
Indian film actresses
Indian television actresses
21st-century Indian actresses
Actresses from Kolkata
Year of birth missing (living people)